Yang Ya-che (born 17 July 1971) is a Taiwanese film and television director. He was nominated for Golden Horse Award for Best Director two times, for Girlfriend, Boyfriend in 2012 and The Bold, the Corrupt, and the Beautiful in 2017.

Filmography

Features
 2008 : Orz Boyz! (囧男孩)
 2012 : Girlfriend, Boyfriend (女朋友。男朋友)
 2017 : The Bold, the Corrupt, and the Beautiful (血觀音)

TV Series
 2021 : The Magician on the Skywalk (天橋上的魔術師)

References

External links

  
 

1971 births
Living people
Taiwanese film directors
Taiwanese screenwriters
Taiwanese LGBT screenwriters
Taiwanese television directors
LGBT film directors
LGBT television directors